First Cabinet of Mateusz Morawiecki
Second Cabinet of Mateusz Morawiecki